Post-amendment to the Tamil Nadu Entertainments Tax Act 1939 on 12 June 2000, Gross fell to 125 per cent of Nett. Commercial Taxes Department disclosed 75.07 crore in entertainment tax revenue for the year.

A list of films released in the Tamil film industry in India in 2003:

List of Tamil films

January—March

April—June

July—September

October—December

The following films also released in 2003, though the release date remains unknown.

Awards

References

2003
Tamil
Tamil
2000s Tamil-language films